Farkë is an administrative unit and former municipality in Tirana County, central Albania. At the 2015 local government reform it became a subdivision of the municipality Tirana. The population at the 2011 census was 22,633.

References

Former municipalities in Tirana County
Administrative units of Tirana